Hydroxyethyl acrylate is an aliphatic organic chemical compound. It has the formula C5H8O3 and the CAS Registry Number 818-61-1. It is REACH registered with an EU number of 212-454-9. It has dual functionality containing a polymerizable acrylic group and a terminal hydroxy group. It is used to make emulsion polymers along with other monomers and the resultant resins are used in coatings, sealants, adhesives and elastomers and other applications.

Synthesis
There are a number of patents and synthesis papers to produce the material mostly aimed at reducing or removing heavy metals as catalysts. The traditional manufacturing process calls for the reaction of ethylene oxide with acrylic acid in the presence of a metal catalyst.

Properties
The material is a clear water-white liquid with a mild but pungent ester like odor. It has a low freezing point.

Applications
The most common use for the material is to be copolymerized with other acrylate and methacrylate monomers to make emulsion and other polymers including hydrogels.  Modification of rubbers and similar compounds is also a use for the material. The resultant polymers may be used to manufacture pressure-sensitive adhesives.

Toxicity
The toxicity of the material has been studied and is fairly well understood.

See also 
 (Hydroxyethyl)methacrylate
 Synthetic resin

References 

Monomers
Acrylate esters